Lapel Lorizon is the second studio album by Mauritian committed song (santé engazé) band Grup Latanier, released in 1985.

It was originally released in 1985 on compact audio cassette. A CD version of the album has later been released in 2004.

Overview
After the immense popular success of their first studio Album Krapo Kriyé, Grup Latanier took four years to write and compose the songs of their second studio album. This album features several songs from Bruno Mooken, who joined the Group after 1981.

Track listing
The list of the songs of the album as shown below is not necessarily in the order in which it was originally released.

 Ti Bato
 Ekute
 Lete ek Liver
 Nu Kalou
 Lapriyer
 Lavi enn grand papa
 Gandhi
 Spektater
 Ki Lavenir
 Dan l'Afrik

External links 
Official site

Grup Latanier albums
1985 albums